The 2019 HFX Wanderers FC season was the first season in the club's history having been founded on 5 May 2018, as well as the first season in Canadian Premier League (CPL) history. Stephen Hart was the club’s first manager, with the team playing at Wanderers Grounds. The season covers the period from 1 November 2018 through to 31 October 2019. Hart, like his peers in the CPL, built a squad from the ground up, and made use of all available mechanisms for player recruitment: the CPL Open Trials, the U-Sports Draft, and benefiting from his domestic and international connections, particularly from his native Trinidad & Tobago.

Overview
The first ever player signed by the team was Canadian defender Zachary Sukunda on 29 November 2018, followed by a quartet of Trinidad & Tobago players in the new year. A contingent of Canadians followed before Hart turned his attention to signing three players from the CPL Open Trials: Kouamé Ouattara, Kodai Iida, and Mohamed Kourouma. Hart also signed all three U-Sports draft picks, and added some veteran attacking options in Luis Alberto Perea and Juan Diego Gutierrez. As the season approached and during the season, Hart raided League 1 Ontario club Vaughan Azzurri three times to round out his squad, signing Tomasz Skublak, Matthew Arnone and eventually, Duran Lee.

A short pre-season in April in the Dominican Republic saw HFX play only two matches, before playing its first ever competitive fixture on 28 April 2019, away at Pacific FC and losing 1-0. Following the defeat, HFX returned home to a raucous Wanderers Grounds on 4 May 2019, picking up its first win in history, defeating eventual champions Forge FC 2-1 with forward Akeem Garcia, scoring the team’s first ever goal in the 30th minute. HFX would finish the Spring Season a respectable fourth place. In the Canadian Championship, HFX dispatched Vaughan Azzurri and Valour FC.

The Fall Season began optimistically on 6 July 2019 with the team recording a 1-0 win over York 9 FC and preparing to face Ottawa Fury FC of the United Soccer League Championship in the third preliminary round of the Canadian Championship. However, a congested fixture schedule would take its toll on the team, playing seven matches in eighteen days in July. HFX would lose all of them, bar one draw away to the afore-mentioned Ottawa Fury FC, which was insufficient to progress in the Canadian Championship. Throughout the year, HFX had had difficulty mustering much offense, which contributed to the slump. Improved defensive performances in September resulted in an uptick of form, but without much goalscoring, HFX could only muster six consecutive draws (a league record), surrendering the lead late on a number of occasions along the way. Combined with suggestions of locker room discord and Hart commenting on his players learning what it meant to be a professional, the Fall Season was difficult for HFX, finishing last which also “earned” the team the proverbial wooden spoon for 2019 as a whole. However, the year would end on a positive note, with Hart and company earning their first and only away win, 2-0 against York 9 FC. The Privateers 1882’s supporter’s group player of the year award went to centre-back, Matthew Arnone.

Off the pitch, the club was a tremendous success, the supporters regularly packing Wanderers Grounds to its limits and making it a difficult place to play for visiting teams. Indeed, in league play Cavalry FC was the only team to ever win at Wanderers Grounds all year. The boisterous atmosphere was the envy of the league and even attracted the notice of Toronto FC captain Michael Bradley who hoped his team would play there in the Canadian Championship.

A last place finish, however, was always going to mean high player turnover. Instead of announcing a list of players released at the end of the season, the club instead would announce returning players only over the course of the off-season.

Current squad

Transfers

In

Draft picks 
HFX Wanderers selected the following players in the 2018 CPL–U Sports Draft on November 12, 2018. Draft picks are not automatically signed to the team roster. Only those who are signed to a contract will be listed as transfers in.

Out

Competitions 
Match times are Atlantic Daylight Time (UTC−3).

Preseason

Canadian Premier League

Spring season

League table

Results summary

Results by match

Matches

Fall season

League table

Results summary

Results by match

Matches

Canadian Championship

First qualifying round

Second qualifying round

Third qualifying round

Statistics

Squad and statistics 

|-
  

    
 
 
  

 

 
  

  

   

 
 
 
 
 
|-
|colspan="11"|Players who left during the season:

|}

Top scorers 
{| class="wikitable sortable alternance"  style="font-size:85%; text-align:center; line-height:14px; width:85%;"
|-
!width=10|Rank
!width=10|Nat.
! scope="col" style="width:275px;"|Player
!width=10|Pos.
!width=80|CPL Spring season
!width=80|CPL Fall season
!width=80|Canadian Championship
!width=80|TOTAL
|-
|1|||| Akeem Garcia        || FW || 3 || 4 || 1 ||8
|-
|2|||| Luis Alberto Perea        || FW || 2 || 1 || 2 ||5
|-
|rowspan=2|3|||| Mohamed Kourouma        || MF || 1 || 0 || 3 ||4
|-
||| Tomasz Skublak        || FW || 0 || 1 || 3 ||4
|-
|rowspan=2|5|||| Matthew Arnone        || DF || 0 || 2 || 0 ||2
|-
||| Juan Diego Gutiérrez        || MF || 0 || 2 || 0 ||2
|-
|rowspan=4|7|||| André Bona        || DF || 0 || 0 || 1 ||1
|-
||| Kodai Iida        || MF || 0 || 1 || 0 ||1
|-
||| Andre Rampersad        || MF || 1 || 0 || 0 ||1
|-
||| Peter Schaale        || DF || 1 || 0 || 0 ||1
|-
|colspan="4"|Own goals      || 0 || 2 || 1 || 3
|-
|- class="sortbottom"
| colspan="4"|Totals||8||13||11||32

Top assists 
{| class="wikitable sortable alternance"  style="font-size:85%; text-align:center; line-height:14px; width:85%;"
|-
!width=10|Rank
!width=10|Nat.
! scope="col" style="width:275px;"|Player
!width=10|Pos.
!width=80|CPL Spring season
!width=80|CPL Fall season
!width=80|Canadian Championship
!width=80|TOTAL
|-
|1|||| Mohamed Kourouma        || MF || 1 || 2 || 1 ||4
|-
|2|||| Kodai Iida        || MF || 2 || 0 || 1 ||3
|-
|rowspan=2|3|||| Peter Schaale        || DF || 0 || 1 || 1 ||2
|-
||| Tomasz Skublak        || FW || 0 || 1 || 1 ||2
|-
|rowspan=6|5|||| Matthew Arnone        || DF || 0 || 0 || 1 ||1
|-
||| Juan Diego Gutiérrez        || MF || 0 || 0 || 1 ||1
|-
||| Elton John        || MF || 0 || 1 || 0 ||1
|-
||| Luis Alberto Perea        || FW || 1 || 0 || 0 ||1
|-
||| Andre Rampersad        || MF || 0 || 1 || 0 ||1
|-
||| Elliot Simmons        || MF || 0 || 0 || 1 ||1
|-
|- class="sortbottom"
| colspan="4"|Totals||4||6||7||17

Clean sheets 
{| class="wikitable sortable alternance"  style="font-size:85%; text-align:center; line-height:14px; width:85%;"
|-
!width=10|Rank
!width=10|Nat.
! scope="col" style="width:275px;"|Player
!width=80|CPL Spring season
!width=80|CPL Fall season
!width=80|Canadian Championship
!width=80|TOTAL
|-
|1|||| Christian Oxner        || 1 || 5 || 0 ||6
|-
|2|||| Jan-Michael Williams        || 1 || 1 || 1 ||3
|-
|- class="sortbottom"
| colspan="3"|Totals||2||6||1||9

Disciplinary record 
{| class="wikitable sortable alternance"  style="font-size:85%; text-align:center; line-height:14px; width:85%;"
|-
!rowspan="2" width=10|No.
!rowspan="2" width=10|Pos.
!rowspan="2" width=10|Nat.
!rowspan="2" scope="col" style="width:275px;"|Player
!colspan="2" width=80|CPL Spring season
!colspan="2" width=80|CPL Fall season
!colspan="2" width=80|Canadian Championship
!colspan="2" width=80|TOTAL
|-
! !!  !!  !!  !!  !!  !!  !! 
|-
|1||GK|||| Jan-Michael Williams    ||1||0||0||1||0||0||1||1
|-
|2||DF|||| Peter Schaale    ||1||0||1||0||1||0||3||0
|-
|3||DF|||| André Bona    ||3||0||4||0||2||0||9||0
|-
|4||DF|||| Chakib Hocine    ||0||0||1||0||0||0||1||0
|-
|5||MF|||| Elton John    ||0||0||3||0||0||0||3||0
|-
|6||DF|||| Chrisnovic N'sa    ||2||0||3||0||0||0||5||0
|-
|7||MF|||| Juan Diego Gutiérrez    ||1||0||2||0||1||0||4||0
|-
|8||MF|||| Elliot Simmons    ||1||0||1||0||1||0||3||0
|-
|9||MF|||| Kodai Iida    ||1||0||0||0||1||0||2||0
|-
|10||FW|||| Luis Alberto Perea    ||1||0||1||0||1||0||3||0
|-
|11||FW|||| Akeem Garcia    ||1||0||1||0||1||0||3||0
|-
|13||MF|||| Kouamé Ouattara    ||0||0||1||0||0||0||1||0
|-
|16||DF|||| Duran Lee    ||0||0||1||0||0||0||1||0
|-
|17||FW|||| Tomasz Skublak    ||1||0||3||0||3||0||7||0
|-
|18||MF|||| Andre Rampersad    ||1||0||3||0||2||0||6||0
|-
|20||DF|||| Ndzemdzela Langwa    ||2||0||1||0||0||0||3||0
|-
|23||DF|||| Matthew Arnone    ||2||0||1||0||0||0||3||0
|-
|24||DF|||| Alex De Carolis    ||0||0||2||0||0||0||2||0
|-
|50||GK|||| Christian Oxner    ||0||0||2||0||0||0||2||0
|-
|- class="sortbottom"
| colspan="4"|Totals||18||0||31||1||13||0||62||1

References

External links 
2019 HFX Wanderers FC season at Official Site

HFX Wanderers FC seasons
HFX Wanderers FC
HFX
HFX Wanderers FC